Thomas Strakosha (born 19 March 1995) is a professional footballer who plays as a goalkeeper for Premier League club Brentford. Born in Greece, he plays for the Albania national team.

Born in Athens, Strakosha played youth football at Panionios before joining Italian club Lazio in 2012. He made his professional debut in August 2015, while on a loan spell at Salernitana. Strakosha made 208 appearances in total for Lazio and won the Coppa Italia and the Supercoppa Italiana twice each.

After playing for Albania at under-19 and under-21 levels, Strakosha made his senior international debut in March 2017 against Italy.

Club career

Early career
Strakosha began his youth career in 2011 at Panionios, from where in the next year he was signed by Lazio for a €75,000 transfer fee. He became a regular starter for the Primavera team and was a key player with the Primavera team that won the 2012–13 Campionato Nazionale Primavera after defeating Atalanta Primavera in the final, 3–0.

Lazio
Following the departure of Lazio first-team starting goalkeeper Juan Pablo Carrizo to Internazionale, in the second half of the 2012–13 season, Strakosha gained entry with the first team as third-choice goalkeeper, behind Federico Marchetti and Albano Bizzarri. He was member of the team that won 2012–13 Coppa Italia after defeating city rivals Roma 0–1 in the final on 26 May 2013. On 18 August 2013, Strakosha was again on the substitutes' bench as Lazio lost 4–0 to Juventus in the 2013 Supercoppa Italiana.

On 2 September 2013, Lazio sold Bizzarri to Genoa and at the same time purchased fellow Albanian goalkeeper Etrit Berisha from Kalmar. This made Strakosha to stand still as a third choice and being only an unused substitute for the 2013–14 season behind the strong challenge for the starting place between Berisha and Marchetti.

On 11 July 2014, Igli Tare, Lazio's sports director, announced that Strakosha's contract was extended until 2019. Strakosha was on the bench for the 2014–15 Coppa Italia final against Juventus on 21 May 2015 where Lazio lost 2–1 in extra-time following a 97th-minute goal by Alessandro Matri.

Loan to Salernitana
In July 2015, Lazio agreed to loan Strakosha to newly promoted Serie B side Salernitana. He was allocated squad number 12, and made his professional debut on 9 August 2015 in the 1–0 win against Pisa for the 2015–16 Coppa Italia second round. A week after his debut, Strakosha played another Coppa Italia match, making several decisive saves and keeping his goal intact for 120 minutes as Salernitana won 1–0 against Chievo Verona to progress to the next round.

Strakosha made his league debut for Salernitana on 6 September in the opening 2015–16 Serie B match against Avellino where he managed to play the full 90-minutes match and his side won 3–1. He was an unused substitute in the next Coppa Italia game on 1 December 2015 against Spezia as the coach Vincenzo Torrente gave the starting place to Pietro Terracciano as Salernitana was eliminated from Coppa Italia, losing the game by 2–0.

Return to Lazio and breakthrough into first-team
In July 2016, following the loan's end, Strakosha returned to Lazio. With the injury of Marchetti and the departure of Berisha to Atalanta, Strakosha was able to make his Lazio debut on 20 September in the league match against Milan. Despite the 2–0 defeat, Strakosha's performance was considered positive, being man of the match for Lazio. Five days later, Strakosha collected his first Serie A clean-sheet only in his second appearance in the 2–0 home win against Empoli, which led the 1982 FIFA World Cup-winner Dino Zoff to praise him by saying: "I can not judge him with only two matches played, but, according to me, he performed well in both matches."

On 22 February 2017, Strakosha renewed his contract with Lazio until 2022. He went on to play as starter until the end of the season, collecting 1844 minutes on field, as Lazio finished the championship in 5th position. He also contributed with 4 matches in the Coppa Italia, including the final, as Lazio was defeated by Juventus 2–0.

Strakosha started the 2017–18 season on 13 August 2017 by playing in the 2017 Supercoppa Italiana against Juventus, winning his maiden trophy as Lazio won 3–2 after a last-minute goal. Against the same opponent on 14 October, Strakosha saved Paulo Dybala's penalty in the 97th minute to rescue a 1–2 win for his team and to put Lazio in 3rd position. It was Strakosha's first Serie A penalty save and Juventus' first Serie A home defeat since August 2015. A week later, he agreed a contract extension, signing until June 2022. Later, he was named as the best young goalkeeper of the 2017–18 season.

Brentford
On 14 July 2022, Strakosha signed a three-year contract with Premier League club Brentford.

International career

Under-17
Strakosha was called up for the first time to Albania's U17 squad by coach Džemal Mustedanagić to participate in the 2012 UEFA European Under-17 Championship elite round. He was an unused substitute for all 3 matches, serving as second choice goalkeeper behind Aldo Teqja.

Under-19
Strakosha was called up to the Albania national under-19 football team to participate in the 2013 UEFA European Under-19 Championship qualification, coached by his father, Foto Strakosha. Thomas played every minute of all 3 matches of the Group 7. Albania finished in the 4th place, with Strakosha conceding in total 6 goals, despite Albania beating top of the table Belgium 3–1 with goals from Enis Gavazaj, Elvis Kabashi and Lorenc Shehaj.

In the 2014 UEFA European Under-19 Championship qualification, Strakosha again played every minute in all 3 matches of the Group 6, leaving behind youth Juventus goalkeeper, Entonjo Elezaj.

Under-20
Strakosha was called up to the U20 team by coach Skënder Gega for the 2013 Mediterranean Games football tournament, which began on 19 June, in Mersin, Turkey. However, Strakosha didn't participate in any match of the tournament.

Under-21

Strakosha was selected for the Albania U21 side that took part in the 2015 UEFA Euro Under-21 qualification. He played in half of all Group 4 matches (4 of 8), as the 4 other matches were played by fellow goalkeepers, Aldo Teqja and Orestis Menka, who each played 2 matches.

In the 2017 UEFA European Under-21 Championship qualification he retained his starting place playing overall 7 out 10 games for full 90-minutes under coach Redi Jupi. He missed out the opening match due to the injury, the closing match due to engagement with Albania senior team and was left on the bench for 1 game against Portugal U21 as Jupi wanted to test Teqja. Following the engagement of Amir Rrahmani with Albania senior team and then his departure to Kosovo national team in September 2016, Strakosha became the under-21 team's captain playing for his 6 last games.

Senior
Strakosha was called up for the first time to the senior Albania squad in August 2016 by coach Gianni De Biasi for the friendly match against Morocco on 31 August 2016 and the 2018 FIFA World Cup qualification opening match against North Macedonia on 5 September 2016 as a 4th choice keeper along Etrit Berisha, Orges Shehi and Alban Hoxha. However, he did not feature in both matches. He continued to be part of the team for the next matches, making his competitive debut on 24 March 2017 due to Berisha's suspension in the match against Italy as Albania trailed 0–2. He went on to make another appearance in Albania's 3–0 win over Israel as Albania finished Group G in 3rd position with 13 points.

Influences
In a 2017 interview, Strakosha stated that his main influences and his idol as a goalkeeper was his own father Foto Strakosha, whom he tries to imitate.

Personal life
Strakosha was born in Athens, Greece. His father, Foto, played as a goalkeeper for two Albanian clubs and several Greek clubs, in addition to representing the Albania national team in the years spanning 1990–2005.

Career statistics

Club

International

Honours
Lazio
Coppa Italia: 2012–13, 2018–19
Supercoppa Italiana: 2017, 2019

References

External links

 
 
 Thomas Strakosha profile at FSHF.org

1995 births
Living people
People from Memaliaj
Albanian footballers
Albania under-21 international footballers
Albania youth international footballers
Albania international footballers
Association football goalkeepers
S.S. Lazio players
U.S. Salernitana 1919 players
Brentford F.C. players
Serie A players
Serie B players
Albanian expatriate footballers
Albanian expatriate sportspeople in Greece
Expatriate footballers in Greece
Albanian expatriate sportspeople in Italy
Expatriate footballers in Italy
Albanian expatriate sportspeople in England
Expatriate footballers in England
Greek people of Albanian descent